Baraderes is a commune in the Nippes department in the southwest part of Haiti.  The town has a picturesque market square with a large church. There are few shops and no hotels.

The area economy is based on subsistence agriculture, although a small association of subsistence farmers, Kafe Devlopman Barade, began exporting coffee to the U.S. in 2008. The town is vulnerable to flooding and is accessible via a rocky dirt road. T

The road is periodically improved, but remains passable only by lorries or high-clearance, four-wheel-drive vehicles. Baradères is also accessible by boat from Petite Trou de Nippes, but sedimentation has made the Bay of Baradères very shallow in places and difficult to navigate—even by canoe.  The river mouth is increasingly being blocked by sediment.

This sediment is a result of severe soil erosion upstream. Primary causes of the erosion probably are riverbank scouring during heavy rainstorms, along with deforestation and cropping of hillsides in the Baradères River valley.

The most popular Localities in Baradères are principally Fond Tortue which is situated west of L'Étang another village in Baradères, Pays Perdu, Boisneau, Fond-Gondol, Sejour, Gaspard, Nan Renaud, Riviere Salee, Digoterie, Guardier, Bourjolly, Fond-Palmiste, Goulot, Palestine to quote only those.

Administration 
The municipality is made up of:

The City of Baradères

And the 5 municipal sections:

1st Section: Gérin or Mouton

2nd Section: Tet Dlo

3rd Section: Fond-Tortue (including the “Fond-Tortue” district)

4th Section: The Plain

5th Section: Rivière-Salée

References

External links 
About Baradères at Just Haiti
About Baradères. Sister Parish Project - St. Pierre parish

Populated places in Nippes
Communes of Haiti